Rhopalognatha is a genus of moths of the family Erebidae. The genus was erected by George Hampson in 1926.

Species
Rhopalognatha anterosticta (Dognin, 1914) Colombia
Rhopalognatha chota (Dognin, 1897) Ecuador
Rhopalognatha cyanescens (Dognin, 1914) Colombia
Rhopalognatha molybdota (Dognin, 1914) Colombia
Rhopalognatha purpureofusca (Dognin, 1914) Colombia

References

Calpinae